Charlesville is a  community in the Canadian province of Nova Scotia, located in the Municipality of the District of Barrington of Shelburne County.

Climate
Charlesville experiences an oceanic climate (Köppen: Cfb) with cold, snowy winters and mild summers.

See also
 List of communities in Nova Scotia

References

External links
Charlesville on Destination Nova Scotia

Communities in Shelburne County, Nova Scotia
General Service Areas in Nova Scotia
Populated coastal places in Canada